Marquess of Waterford is a title in the Peerage of Ireland and the premier marquessate in that peerage. It was created in 1789 for George Beresford, 2nd Earl of Tyrone. It is presently held by Henry Beresford, 9th Marquess of Waterford.

The Beresford family descends from Tristram Beresford, who originated from Kent but settled in Ireland in the 17th century. His eldest son Tristram Beresford sat as a member of the Irish House of Commons. On 5 May 1665 he was created a baronet, of Coleraine in County Londonderry, in the Baronetage of Ireland. His great-grandson (the title having descended from father to son), the fourth Baronet, married Lady Catherine, oldest daughter of James de la Poer, 3rd Earl of Tyrone (see Earl of Tyrone). In 1720, he was created both Baron Beresford, of Beresford, in the County of Cavan, and Viscount Tyrone in the Peerage of Ireland. He was further honoured when he was made Earl of Tyrone in the Peerage of Ireland in 1746. In 1767, four years after his death, the Dowager Countess of Tyrone was confirmed with the hereditary peerage title Baroness La Poer in the Peerage of Ireland (created by writ ca. 1650). Lord Tyrone was succeeded by his fourth but eldest surviving son, the second Earl, who also inherited the title Baron La Poer from his mother in 1769. In 1786 he was created Baron Tyrone, of Haverfordwest in the County of Pembroke, in the Peerage of Great Britain. Three years later he was made Marquess of Waterford in the Peerage of Ireland. The titles descended in the direct line until the death of his grandson, the third Marquess, in 1859. The late Marquess was succeeded by his younger brother, the fourth Marquess.   the titles are held by the latter's great-great-great-grandson, the ninth Marquess, who succeeded his father in 2015.

Several other members of the Beresford family have also gained distinction. John Beresford, fifth son of the first Earl, was an influential statesman. Marcus Beresford, eldest son of John Beresford, represented Dungarvan in the Irish Parliament. His second son was the Conservative politician William Beresford, who was the father of Mostyn Beresford (1835–1911), a Lieutenant-General in the Army, and of Edward Marcus Beresford (1836–1896), a Major-General in the Army. The Right Reverend George Beresford, second son of John Beresford, was Bishop of Kilmore. His son the Most Reverend Marcus Beresford was Archbishop of Armagh. He was the father of George Beresford, a politician, and of Major Henry Marcus Beresford, who was the father of the photographer George Charles Beresford. John Claudius Beresford, third son of John Beresford, was a politician. William Beresford, seventh son of the first Earl, was Archbishop of Tuam and was created Baron Decies in 1812. Lord John Beresford, second surviving son of the first Marquess, was Archbishop of Armagh. Lord George Beresford, younger son of the first Marquess, was a politician. William Beresford, illegitimate son of the first Marquess, was a Field Marshal in the British Army and was created Viscount Beresford in 1823. John Beresford, illegitimate son of the first Marquess, was a soldier and politician and was created a baronet in 1814 (see Beresford-Peirse baronets). Lord Charles Beresford, second son of the fourth Marquess, was a naval commander and politician and was created Baron Beresford in 1916. Lord William Beresford, third son of the fourth Marquess, was a soldier and recipient of the Victoria Cross. Lord Marcus Beresford, fourth son of the fourth Marquess, was a courtier.

The eldest son of the Marquess is styled with the courtesy title Earl of Tyrone and the Earl's eldest son as Lord Le Poer. Additionally, the Marquess club is White's, where the family have been members since the 18th century. The family seat is Curraghmore, near Portlaw, County Waterford, in the Republic of Ireland. The Beresford family, owned land in various parts of Ireland, including almost 40,000 acres in county Waterford, 26,000 in county Wicklow and over 4,500 acres in county Leitrim. The family remain amongst the largest land owners in all Ireland.

All but the 4th Lord Waterford was awarded the Order of Saint Patrick. The 6th Lord Waterford was the last to receive the honour.

Not to be confused with the ancient title (created in 1446 and still extant) of Earl of Waterford (also in the Peerage of Ireland)  of the Earl of Shrewsbury (the Earl of Waterford is also Lord High Steward of Ireland).

Beresford baronets, of Colerain (1665–present)
Sir Tristram Beresford, 1st Baronet (died 1673)
Sir Randal Beresford, 2nd Baronet (died 1681)
Sir Tristram Beresford, 3rd Baronet (1669–1701)
Sir Marcus Beresford, 4th Baronet (1694–1763) (created Baron Beresford and Viscount Tyrone in 1720,  and elevated to Earl of Tyrone in 1746)

Earls of Tyrone (1746–present)
Marcus Beresford, 1st Earl of Tyrone (1694–1763)
George de La Poer Beresford, 2nd Earl of Tyrone (1735–1800) (received the peerage Baron La Poer in 1769, created Baron Tyrone in 1786, and elevated to Marquess of Waterford in 1789)

Marquesses of Waterford (1789–present)
George de La Poer Beresford, 1st Marquess of Waterford (1735–1800)
Henry de La Poer Beresford, 2nd Marquess of Waterford (1772–1826)
Henry de La Poer Beresford, 3rd Marquess of Waterford (1811–1859)
John de La Poer Beresford, 4th Marquess of Waterford (1814–1866)
John Henry de La Poer Beresford, 5th Marquess of Waterford (1844–1895)
Henry de La Poer Beresford, 6th Marquess of Waterford (1875–1911)
John Charles de La Poer Beresford, 7th Marquess of Waterford (1901–1934)
John Hubert de La Poer Beresford, 8th Marquess of Waterford (1933–2015)
Henry Nicholas de la Poer Beresford, 9th Marquess of Waterford (born 1958)

The heir apparent is the present holder's son Richard John de la Poer Beresford, Earl of Tyrone (born 1987), a polo professional who is known as Richard Le Poer.

See also
Baron Beresford
Baron Decies
Baron La Poer
Beresford-Peirse baronets
Earl of Tyrone
George Beresford
Viscount Beresford

References

Marquessates in the Peerage of Ireland
Marquess
Marquess
Noble titles created in 1789